Damji is an Arabic surname. Notable people with the surname include:

 Farah Damji (born 1966), British author and criminal
 Kamlesh Manusuklal Damji Pattni (born 1965), Kenyan businessman and pastor

Arabic-language surnames